Hingol National Park or Hungol National Park is the largest national park in Pakistan, located in the Makran coastal region. Hingol was declared a national park in 1988. 

The park is named after the southern part of the Hangul River which flows along the shores of the Arabian Sea and is home to large numbers of waterfowl and a wealth of marine life. Hangul National Park contains six distinct ecosystems as well as both desert and plains regions, making it unique among the national parks of Pakistan. 

The park is bordered by a dense forest to the north, a barren mountain range to the south, and the Hangul River tributary, which is home to thousands of migratory birds and marsh crocodiles.  The Gulf of Oman and the Arabian Sea are also to the south.

The park’s unique rock formations have been attracting tourists from all over the country for some time - notably since the completion of the Makran Coastal Highway in 2004.

Wildlife
Hangul National Park is a natural sanctuary for endangered wildlife in Pakistan. It is home to about 257 plant and 289 animal species, including 35 mammals, aquatic animals, amphibians, reptiles and migratory birds, including hundreds of rare species. Marsh crocodiles are regularly spotted on the coastline adjacent to Hangul National Park, and there are an estimated 60 crocodiles in various places. 

The Hangul Bay is home to a large number of other aquatic life including Indo-Pacific dolphins and green & olive turtles, and various rare species of fish and turtles live in the coastal areas adjacent to Hangul National Park. These turtles come to the beach every night in August to lay their eggs at night. Increasing plastic pollution on the shores made it difficult for them to dig, so the female turtles left without laying eggs. Since then, the number of these turtles on the shores of Sindh and Balochistan has dropped significantly.

Rock formations

The University of Geneva and the University of Tehran conducted a joint study on the attractive features of this coastal strip of Iran and Balochistan, in which 36 rock formations were observed. According to this research, the effective process of erosion and sedimentation has played an important role in the erosion of rocks here for centuries in which the waves of the sea carry with them a lot of soil and other substances to the shore. Layers of soil 1 to 10 meters and in many places even thicker were observed on these rocks of different heights, which gradually increased from the beach. The tidal waves of the sea and the strong stormy winds have carved the Makran coastal strip and the adjoining mountain cliffs in such a way that at first glance the area resembles a bizarre archaeological complex preserving the remains of some ancient civilization. The most famous of these rocks are the Princess of Hope and the Sphinx.

Princess of Hope
The most spectacular landform of Hangul National Park is a hoodoo called the Princess of Hope. Seen from afar, it resembles a gargantuan statue of a tall woman looking for something on the distant horizon. When the famous Hollywood actress Angelina Jolie came to Pakistan on a UN goodwill mission in 2004, this rock formation caught her attention and inspired her to name it 'Princess of Hope'. Despite its statuesque appearance, however, the pinnacle owes its form purely to ocean winds and other natural forces of erosion.

Balochistan Sphinx

The Balochistan Sphinx, also known as the "Lion of Balochistan" or Abul-Hol, is a natural rock structure that bears resemblance to a sphinx and is visible from the Buzi Pass section of the Makran Coastal Highway.

Mud volcanoes
Hingol mud volcano ranging in height from 800 to 1500 feet are abundant in Hangul National Park, mostly in the Mid-Hor area. According to Muhammad Hanif Bhatti, a well-known traveler from Karachi, when he first saw the Chandra Gupta mudflat in Hangul National Park in 2010 he was amazed by the beauty and uniqueness of this natural process. At the time, the volcano was difficult to reach, but since the completion of the highway visitors to the mud volcanoes have increased significantly.

Hinglaj Mata mandir
Hinglaj Mata mandir, or Nani Mandir, is one of the most important Hindu shrines in Pakistan and the site of a pilgrimage that brings over 250,000 people to its location at the center Hingol National Park every spring. 

The Kali Mata temple in a cave in the Hanglaj Valley is said to be 200,000 years old. The annual festival is attended by 20,000 to 30,000 people and is organized by a committee of leading Hindus from Sindh and Balochistan. There are only four passenger compartments, so most pilgrims stay in tents, while many have to stay under trees or in the hot sun. Apart from accommodation, the most difficult for the pilgrims who come here is to climb the Chandra Gup Mt. Muslim tourists are allowed to enter the temple only after undergoing a rigorous identification process.

Makran beaches
The beach adjacent to Kand Malir on the last corner of Hangul National Park, also known as 'Virgin Beach', was added to the list of Asia's 50 Most Beautiful Beaches in 2018. The deserts, high mountains and volcanoes along this golden coast add to the tourist attraction, but unlike other beaches in Pakistan, much of the tourist activity has not yet begun here. Traveling along the Makran Coastal Highway, one can easily reach Sapat Beach in Boji Koh, another enchanting beach in Balochistan. The Hangul National Park Management Team consists of more than 20 members, including the Wildlife Pakistan, the Provincial Department of Livestock, Environment and Tourism. But with the Balochistan provincial government managing the park, many areas still need reform.

Natural history

Flora
Hingol National Park contains a variety of topographical features and habitats, varying from arid subtropical forest in the north to arid montane in the west. Large areas of the park are covered with drift sand and can be classified as coastal semi desert. The park includes the estuary of the Hungol River which supports a significant diversity of bird and fish species.

Some 250 plant species were recorded in the initial surveys including 7 yet undescribed species. Many more species are yet to be collected.

Fauna
Hingol National Park is known to support at least 35 species of mammals, 65 species of amphibians and reptiles, and 185 species of birds. The park forms an excellent habitat to wild Sindh ibex, Baluchistan urial, and Chinkara. Ibex is found in all steep mountain ranges and are numerous in the Hinglaj and Rodani Kacho Mountain areas. The population is estimated over 3000.

Mammals
Persian leopard
Caracal
Jungle cat
Asiatic wildcat
Indian wolf
Golden jackal
White-footed fox
Bengal fox
Striped hyena
Honey badger
Afghan hedgehog
Indian pangolin
Balochistan gerbil
Indian gerbil
Hotson's mouse-like hamster
Central Asian boar
Sindh ibex
Urial
Chinkara

Reptiles
Marsh crocodile
Olive ridley
Green sea turtle
Desert monitor
Yellow monitor
Indian fringe-fingered lizard
Indian sand-swimmer
Carrot-tail viper gecko
Melanophidium bilineatum

Birds
Houbara bustard
Spot-billed pelican
Dalmatian pelican
Bonelli's eagle
Imperial eagle
Golden eagle
Tawny eagle
Griffon vulture
Egyptian vulture
Cinereous vulture
Laggar falcon
Red-necked falcon
Kestrel
Brown-necked raven
Lichtenstein's sandgrouse
Grey francolin
See-see partridge
Stone-curlew
Crowned sandgrouse
Lichtenstein's sandgrouse
Painted sandgrouse
Eurasian stone-curlew
Indian eagle-owl
Sind woodpecker
Siberian stonechat
Long-billed pipit
Grey hypocolius
Crested lark
Hoopoe
Shrike
Black bittern
Goliath heron
Black ibis
Variable wheatear

Amphibians
Skittering frog
Indus Valley toad

Fish
Golden mahasheer
Botchee

Conservation
There are 14 species of birds of special conservation interest on account of being threatened (as per IUCN Red List 2005), very rare or key species of the park.
Sociable lapwing (critically endangered)
Saker falcon (endangered))
White-backed vulture (vulnerable)
Spot-billed pelican (vulnerable)
Dalmatian pelican (vulnerable)
Eastern imperial eagle (vulnerable)
Pallas's fish eagle (vulnerable)
Houbara bustard (vulnerable)
Black ibis (near-threatened)
Black-tailed godwit(near-threatened)
Sooty falcon (rare)
Goliath heron (vagrant)
Desert owl (confined to Makran Coast only)
Brown fish owl (very rare)

Management
According to independent reports, 20 staff members, 18 game watchers and 2 deputy rangers are responsible for the management of the park. They are under the guidance of the park manager, who reports to the conservator and the Secretary of Wildlife, Forest, Livestock, Environment and Tourism.

Photo gallery

See also
Hingol mud volcano
Makran 
Natural history of Balochistan, Pakistan

References

External links

official Hingol National Park website

National parks of Pakistan
Deserts of Pakistan
Protected areas of Balochistan, Pakistan
Awaran District
Gwadar District
Lasbela District
Protected areas established in 1988